Etowah is an unincorporated community in Kanawha County, West Virginia, United States.

The name Etowah is Native American in origin.

References 

Unincorporated communities in West Virginia
Unincorporated communities in Kanawha County, West Virginia